The Legislature of Catamarca is the local legislature of the Argentinian province of Catamarca. It is a bicameral body, comprising the Chamber of Deputies of Catamarca (41 representative), and the Senate of Catamarca (16 members). It is one of eight bicameral legislatures in the country.

It is elected by a general provincial first-past-the-post voting (Senate) and proportional representation for the Chamber, renewed every 2 years by electing a new half of each house. Each representative serves a four-year term. The Provincial Constitution denotes its legislative powers.

The Legislature meets in the provincial capital.

See also

 List of provincial legislatures in Argentina
 Parliament of Argentina

References

Bicameral legislatures
Government of Argentina
Catamarca Province
Catamarca